Layar LRT station (SW6) is an elevated Light Rail Transit (LRT) station on the Sengkang LRT line West Loop in Fernvale, Sengkang, Singapore, located at Sengkang West Avenue near the junction of Fernvale Link. It was opened on 29 January 2005 together with the Punggol LRT East Loop. The station is located off the western border of Sungei Punggol.

Etymology
The name of the station means "sail" in Malay, which is consistent with the seafaring theme of Sengkang.

References

External links

Railway stations in Singapore opened in 2005
Fernvale, Singapore
LRT stations in Sengkang
Light Rail Transit (Singapore) stations